Sandra Gómez Pérez (born 22 May 1986 in Pamplona, Navarra) is a vision impaired B2/S12 swimmer from Spain. She competed at the 2004 Summer Paralympics and 2008 Summer Paralympics, winning a gold medal at the 2004 Games in the Women's SB12 100 meter breaststroke race.  She won a silver in the Women's SB12 100 meter breaststroke at the 2008 Games. In 2007, she competed at the IDM German Open.  In April 2008, she was one of four Navarre women on the short list to attend the Beijing Paralympics.

References

External links 
 
 

1986 births
Living people
Spanish female breaststroke swimmers
Paralympic swimmers of Spain
Paralympic gold medalists for Spain
Paralympic silver medalists for Spain
Paralympic medalists in swimming
Swimmers at the 2008 Summer Paralympics
Swimmers at the 2004 Summer Paralympics
Swimmers at the 2012 Summer Paralympics
Medalists at the 2004 Summer Paralympics
Medalists at the 2008 Summer Paralympics
Sportspeople from Navarre
S12-classified Paralympic swimmers
21st-century Spanish women